Eisenhower State Park is a state park located in Grayson County, Texas, northwest of Denison, Texas on the shores of Lake Texoma.

History
The park was acquired in 1954 by a Department of Army lease. The park was opened to the public in 1958.  The park is named for the 34th U.S. president, Dwight D. Eisenhower, who was born in Denison.

In the early 1830s, the area was important to Anglo settlers, particularly as a route to Texas and the American southwest. It was also an area of cattle trails.

Recreation
The park offers nature programs throughout the year. The park has facilities for picnicking, nature study, hiking, biking, fishing, swimming, boating, water skiing, wildlife observation, All-terrain vehicle (ATV) use, and camping.

Also located within the park is the Eisenhower Yacht Club, a privately operated full-service marina.

Plant and animal life
Several varieties of wildflowers grow in the park. A wide variety of trees grow in the park including oak, ash, elm, cedar, dogwood, cottonwood, soapberry, locust, redbud, persimmon, and bois d'arc. Mammals at the park include armadillo, bat, beaver, coyote, deer, fox, mink, nutria, opossum, rabbit, raccoon, skunk, and squirrel. Wintering bald eagles, pelicans, loons, and other waterfowl may be observed in the area. Lake fishing offers a variety of bass, sunfish, and catfish.

See also
List of Texas state parks
Eisenhower Birthplace State Historic Site
Eisenhower State Park (Kansas)

References

External links
 Official Site
Film footage of Eisenhower State Park from Exploring the Texas State Park System on the Texas Archive of the Moving Image

State parks of Texas
Protected areas of Grayson County, Texas
Protected areas established in 1954
1954 establishments in Texas